The Hejazi turban, also spelled Hijazi turban, is a type of the turban headdress native to the region of Hejaz in modern-day western Saudi Arabia.

It is but one version of Arabian turbans that have been worn in the Arabian Peninsula from the pre-Islamic era to the present day. Islamic Arabs of the Arabian Peninsula region such as the Quraysh, Ansar, Qahtanites, Kindites, Nabataeans, Qedarites, Adnanites, Himyarites, Lakhmids, Ghassanids, and others used to wear the turban alongside the Keffiyeh which is also popular today in the rest of the Arabian peninsula.

Versions
The Arabian Hejazi turban is still worn today by some Ulama and Imams.

Worn in coloured or white varieties, the turban was a common inherited cultural headwear in the region of Hijaz. The Imamah was the traditional headwear for many in the region, from traders to the religious scholars, and the colours in which it was worn differed between individuals. 

In particular, the coloured turban is known as a Ghabanah and was a common head accessory for the inhabitants of Mecca, Madinah and Jeddah in particular. Ghabanah today is the heritage uniform headwear for local traders and the general categories of the prestigious and middle-class. There are several types of Ghabanah, perhaps the most famous is the yellow (Halabi), that is made in Aleppo and is characterized by different inscriptions and is wrapped on a dome-like hollow taqiyah or a Turkish fez or kalpak cap. It is similar to turbans in neighbouring regions, like the masar, a traditional lightly-coloured turban in Oman that is also common in some regions like the south of Yemen and Hadhramaut. 

Additionally, sometimes keffiyeh or white ghutrah are wrapped around the head in a style resembling a turban.

Suppression
However, with the Hijaz in particular falling under Saudi control, there have been attempts to suppress local ethnic dress and enforce cultural homogeneity with wider Saudi society. With the introduction of a law in 1964, there was a temporary ban on wearing the traditional turban - local urban Hijazis could no longer wear them and had to instead wear the Saudi national dress that included a white Ghutrah or red and white Shemagh instead.

See also

Citations

References
  
 Danforth, L.M., 2016. 6. Saving Jeddah, the Bride of the Red Sea. In Crossing the Kingdom (pp. 168-185). University of California Press.
 
 
 
 

Turbans
Islamic male clothing
Hejaz
Middle Eastern clothing
Arabic clothing